Copplestone railway station is on the Tarka Line serving the village of Copplestone in Devon, England. The station and trains are operated by Great Western Railway.

History 

The station was opened by the North Devon Railway on 1 August 1854. The railway was single track. A passing loop was provided at Copplestone but there was initially only one platform. A second platform was added and in 1873 a ten-lever signal box was built at the northern end of the new platform where there was a view of the goods yard on the other side of the line.

The goods yard closed on 6 September 1965. The double track was taken out of use on 17 October 1971 and the signal box closed.

1861 accident 
Thirteen passengers and a guard on the second train were injured in the collision. The signalman was imprisoned for a month after admitting causing the accident during a lapse of concentration. The points and signals were not interlocked at that time, but a second platform was added and in 1873 a ten-lever signal box was built at the northern end of the new platform where there was a view of the goods yard on the other side of the line.

Description
The station is on the northern edge of Copplestone. and has just one platform which is on the west side of the line. There is a modern waiting shelter. The former station master's house is fenced off from the platform and is in residential use. Additional housing has been built along the station approach road. The remains of the second platform can still be seen but there is no track on that side of the station.

Services 
All services at Copplestone are operated by Great Western Railway.

Community railway 
The railway between Exeter and Barnstaple is designated as a community railway and is supported by marketing provided by the Devon and Cornwall Rail Partnership. The line is promoted as the Tarka Line.

References

External links

Railway stations in Devon
Former London and South Western Railway stations
Railway stations in Great Britain opened in 1854
Railway stations served by Great Western Railway
1854 establishments in England
DfT Category F2 stations